The Weightlifting competition at the 2010 Central American and Caribbean Games was being held in Mayagüez, Puerto Rico. 

The tournament was scheduled to be held from 18 to 22 July at the Dr. Juan Sanchez Acevedo Coliseum at Porta del Sol.

Medal summary

Men's events

Women's events

External links

July 2010 sports events in North America
Events at the 2010 Central American and Caribbean Games
2010
2010 in weightlifting
Weightlifting in Puerto Rico